The  is a ceremonial sword believed to be a gift from the king of Baekje to a Yamato ruler. It is mentioned in the Nihon Shoki in the fifty-second year of the reign of the semi-mythical Empress Jingū. It is a 74.9 cm (29.5 in) long iron sword with six branch-like protrusions along the central blade. The original sword has been conserved since antiquity in the Isonokami Shrine in Nara Prefecture, Japan and is not on public display. An inscription on the side of the blade is an important source for understanding the relationships between kingdoms of the Korean peninsula and Japan in that period.

Appearance
The blade of the sword is 65.5 cm and the tang is 9.4 cm long. There is no hole on the tang to fasten the sword with a hilt. The sword is broken at the top of the tang. 
In the past, the material was considered to be forged mild steel from the state of fracture surface, but the theory that it was cast became the mainstream through the latest research by Tsutomu Suzuki and reproduction experiment by swordsmith Kunihira Kawachi. As the ‘branches’ appear to be quite delicate, and their functionality in melee combat doubtful, it is unlikely that the Seven-Branched Sword was used as a military weapon. Instead, it probably had a ceremonial function.

The sword has been stored in the Isonokami Shrine since ancient times. The inscription on the blade had been hidden by rust and was rediscovered in the 1870s by Masatomo Kan, a Shinto priest at the shrine. There is a two-sided inscription on the sword which is inlaid in gold. This sword appears to have been mentioned in the Nihon Shoki. Many scholars have engaged in study to interpret the vague inscription. Closeup pictures of the sword taken with X-ray were published in 1996.

Origins
Analysis and archeology have suggested that the sword's origins lie in Baekje Kingdom.
The sword's peculiar design—with the tip of the blade counting as the "seventh" branch—is indicative of contemporary Korean tree-motifs. Other examples of this motif include the Baekje Crown and the Silla Crown. If the weapon had indeed been produced in Korea, it would have represented one of the prime artistic accomplishments of Baekje swordsmithery.

Description in Nihon Shoki
The sword is mentioned in the biography of Empress Jingū, a legendary Japanese empress in the ancient era. The following is the original Classical Chinese text;
則獻七枝刀一口 七子鏡一面及種種重寶 仍啟曰 臣國以西有水 源出自谷那鐵山 其邈七日行之不及 當飲是水 便取是山鐵以永奉聖朝

In English;
(52nd year, Autumn, 9th month 10th day. Kutyo and others came along with Chikuma Nagahiko) and presented a seven-branched sword and a seven-little-one-mirror, with various other objects of great value. They addressed the Empress, saying :-"West of thy servants' country there is a river-source which issues from Mount Cholsan in Kong-na. It is distant seven days' journey. It need not be approached, but one should drink of this water, and so having gotten the iron of this mountain, wait upon the sage Court for all ages."

Inscription on the sword
The inscription states:

In original Chinese characters:
First Side: 泰■四年十(一)月十六日丙午正陽造百錬(銕)七支刀(出)辟百兵宜供供候王■■■■ (作 or 祥)
Second Side: 先世以來未有此刀百濟王世(子)奇生聖音故爲倭王旨造傳示後世

Characters in parentheses are ambiguous. Characters represented with black blocks are entirely unreadable.

In English:

First Side: "At noon on the sixteenth day of the eleventh month [May], fourth year of Tai■, the sword was made of 100 times hardened steel. Using the sword repels 100 enemy soldiers [Appropriate for the polite duke lord] It is sent [bestowed] to the duke lord. (Manufactured by or good fortune to...) [ ]"  
Second Side: "Never before has there been such a blade. The crown prince of the king of Baekje, who lives under august sounds, had this sword made for King of Wa in the hope that it might be passed on to later generations."

Interpretation of the inscription
2nd character on the first side, and when the sword was made: The first four characters are generally decoded as "4th year of Taihe" (the era name of Emperor Fei of the Eastern Jin dynasty in China), but the second one is ambiguous. Taihe 4 corresponds to year 369 CE. Kim Sok Hyong, a North Korean scholar, proposed a theory that the first two characters instead refer to a local era name of the Baekje, but this theory has been challenged since no other archaeological discovery reveals the existence of unique era names assigned by the Baekje. 
Hong Sung-Hwa, a scholar at Korea University, argues that "十(一)月十六日(the sixteenth day of the eleventh month)" suggests the year 408, because if the 6th, November is 日干支 (日干支 is a day by the sexagenary cycle) of 丙午 in 408, the year is the 4 years by King Jun-ji (腆支王) in Baekje. From this we can speculate that Baekje assigned era names autonomously (Goguryeo and Silla had their own era names). In 409, Wei's envoy visited Baekje, and King Jun-ji extended hospitality to him, so that sword was formed by 408.

Middle of the first side: The characters show the sword was made of steel and can repel an enemy. The subsequent characters are the most controversial part of the inscription. Kim notes that the sword uses the term "候王" translated as "enfeoffed lord," and thus claimed that the Wa king was subservient to the Baekje ruler.
The majority of Japanese scholars do not agree with Kim's theory. They note that the meaning of the term "候王" varied in the different periods. After the Han Dynasty, the term was used fluently and always just as an honorific.

End of the first side: Although four of the five last characters are undecodable, the last character indicates that the previous ones were either the name of author or a prayer phrase such as "永年大吉祥"(Have Great Fortunes Forever"). In both cases, the phrase should generally indicate the end of inscription, and that the text on the second side is not a continuation. There is also a theory that the second side was written by different person, or at different time.

11th to 13th characters on the second side, and who presented the sword: the 11th to 13th characters may be decodable as "王世子"(Crown Prince), causing some scholars to regard that the sword was presented by the Crown Prince of Baekje, who eventually ascended as King Geungusu. However, as this segment includes ambiguous characters, it is not entirely clear who in Baekje presented the sword.

17th character on the second side: The character is regarded to be either "音"(Sound) or "晉"(Jin Dynasty). The former interpretation indicates that the phrase "奇生聖音" has a Buddhist or Taoist nuance, and that the bestower has "lived under august (holy) sounds". Other scholars suggest that the phrase means "born coincidentally on august (holy) Jin Dynasty".

19th to 23rd characters on the second side, and the presentee: The phrase, "爲倭王旨造", is translated in various ways through different interpretations of the 22nd character "旨".
"旨" as a personal name: Regarding the letter as a personal name. Thus translates the phrase as following. "For Shi, the King of Wa, made (the sword)".
"旨" as "order": Translates "for the order of King of Wa, made (the sword)". 
"旨" as "deliberately": Translates "for King of Wa, deliberately made (the sword)".
"旨" as "first": Interpreting the letter as abbreviation of "嘗". Translates "for the first time, made (the sword) for King of Wa".

Treating it as a personal name leads to the Baekje-centric idea that Baekje's presenter boldly writes the name of the King of Wa, and thus regards him lower. Treating it as "order" leads to the Japan-centric idea that Baekje presented the sword because the King of Wa ordered him to do so. Therefore, the interpretation of this character tends to be controversial. Ueda Masaaki (quoted by Saeki, 1977) is rather an exception among Japanese historians because he “has maintained that the Seven-branched sword was ‘bestowed’ on the Wa ruler by the king of Baekche.” Ueda “based his interpretation on the argument that the term ‘koo’ [howang] appearing in the inscription denotes a ruler in vassalage to the Paekche king and that the inscription is written in the commanding tone of a superior addressing an inferior, exemplified by the sentence reading ‘Hand down [this sword] to [your] posterity." However, Saeki (1977) argues that one
can not interpret the inscription to mean either “to bestow” the sword on the King in vassalage or “to respectfully present” to the emperor, as many Japanese scholars have maintained since the Meiji period. Saeki seems to be inclined to take Hirano’s argument that the inscription simply indicates the fact there was a respectful and sincere relationship between the rulers of
Baekche and Wa.

Yet another theory proposed by Kōsaku Hamada of Kyushu University suggests that the original seven-branched sword was created by Eastern Jin in 369 (泰和四年) for a vassal lord with the first inscription. In 372, King Geunchogo of Baekje sent an embassy to arrive at the court of Eastern Jin in 372, and then a Jin envoy was sent to the Paekche court, granting the title of “General Stabilizing the East and Governor of Le-lang" (鎭東將軍). The sword was given to the king around this time. The king of Baekje ordered the creation of a replica of the sword with the second inscription and sent it to Wa for an alliance as peers under Eastern Jin. Thus no vassalage relationships are involved between Baekje and Wa. He claims that this explains the commanding tone of the first inscription and the respect paid to Jin (owes his life to august Jin) in the second inscription.

While the inscription of the sword is controversial and is used by many nationalists to support their own agendas, the sword does prove, at the very least, that there were very close ties between the Baekje and the Wa, and the opening of friendly relations between two countries probably dates to the year 372.

In connection with the date of fabrication, Hong Sung-Hwa, a scholar of Korea University, says in 396-409, Baekje came under attack by Goguryeo, so Baekje needed to form an alliance with the Wei; King Jun-ji of Baekje gave King of Wei the sword.

In popular media
In popular media, the seven-branched sword has appeared in:
Demon Sword, the protagonist eventually wields an unnamed sword that resembles the seven-branched sword.
SaGa Frontier The Final Boss of Blue's Story is depicted as wielding a Seven Branched Sword in its humanoid form.
Tenchu: Stealth Assassins the final villain Lord Mei-Oh wields the Shichishito, a seven-branched sword. 
Fire Emblem series: 
In Fire Emblem Awakening, a sword named "Amatsu" found in the game resembles the Seven-Branched Sword.  
In Fire Emblem: Three Houses, a Heroes' Relic weapon called "Thunderbrand" is wielded by the character Catherine. The Sword strongly resembles The Seven-Branched Sword.
Ninja Gaiden (2004 reboot), whose plot revolves around the theft of the Dark Dragon Blade, a stylised version of the seven-branched sword.
Bleach as Hinamori Momo’s Zanpakutō, Tobiume, has taken the form of the double-edged blade with three of these prongs.
Kimetsu no Yaiba as a handheld wooden heirloom used by Tanjiro when dancing the Kamado family's traditional Hinokami Kagura dance.
Ōkami as one of the glaives wielded by Amaterasu, the Seven Strike sword. The Ninetails also has the Ninestrike sword similarly based on the seven-branched sword but with nine prongs.
Final Fantasy where it has appeared in several games as the Nanatsuyanotachi.
Samurai Warriors as the type of weapon wielded by Kenshin Uesugi.
Sekiro: Shadows Die Twice as the sword wielded by the Divine Dragon.
Elden Ring as a spear greatly resembling the Seven-Branced Sword called the Death Ritual Spear.
Monster Hunter series as a Greatsword crafted from electric monster Kirin, King Thundersword.
Magi as the Rampaging Unicorn horn wielded by Hinahoho. It is not a sword and being double-ended has two additional prongs on the handle end.
Nioh 2 as a magic-imbued sword named Sohayamaru passed down across generations. The sword is central to the narrative and is used to slay Yokai, particularly Kashin Koji / Ōtakemaru, one of the 3 Great Demons of Japan. Later used as a conduit for time travel, to which the player is momentarily transported to the Heian Era, to meet previous holders of the blade.
Phoenix Wright: Ace Attorney - Trials and Tribulations features a sword named "Shichishito", which is presented as evidence in a murder case.
Megami Tensei artist Kazuma Kaneko has depicted the god Susano-o wielding the seven-branched sword in multiple games. 
Persona 5, while not the same shape, Yusuke Kitagawa's Persona, Kamu Susano-o, wields a sword of the same name.
Higurashi When They Cry, the sword appears as Onigari-no-Ryuou in Matsuribayashi-hen, though the number of branches is inconsistent.
Record of Ragnarok, Buddha wields the Great Nirvana Sword - Zero that greatly resembles the seven-branched sword, gained from the power of a god he was formerly fighting.
Danganronpa 2: Goodbye Despair, appears as a present called "Seven Sword".
Guild Wars 2, in Super Adventure Box Tribulation Mode, it is wielded by the Tribulation Cloud. A version done in the game's visual style was also added as a skin in the game's microtransaction store.
Dark Cloud and its sequel Dark Chronicle, used as a weapon for Toan in Dark Cloud, and for Monica Raybrandt in Dark Chronicle.
Magia Record, wielded by Shizuka Tokime, one of the major Magical Girls of Arc 2 in the Main Story

See also
 History of Japan
 History of Korea
 Amenohiboko
 Gwanggaeto Stele
 Japanese swords
 Korean swords
 List of National Treasures of Japan (archaeological materials)

References

Baekje
Ancient Chinese swords
Korean swords
Ancient swords
Kofun period
National Treasures of Japan
Chinese inscriptions
Individual weapons